Fonfría is a municipality located in the Jiloca Comarca, province of Teruel, Aragon, Spain. According to the 2010 census the municipality has a population of 30 inhabitants.

Fonfría is located in the Sierra de Cucalón area, close to the sources of the Huerva River.

See also
Jiloca Comarca
List of municipalities in Teruel

References

Municipalities in the Province of Teruel